The Four Winds Invitational is a tournament on the Epson Tour, the LPGA's developmental tour. It has been a part of the tour's schedule since 2012. It is held at South Bend Country Club in South Bend, Indiana.

In 2020, the tournament was postponed due to the COVID-19 pandemic.

Winners

References

External links
Coverage on Epson Tour website

Symetra Tour events
Golf in Indiana
Recurring sporting events established in 2012
2012 establishments in Indiana